William D. Carnihan (12 July 1894 in Hamilton, South Lanarkshire, Scotland – 16 November 1964 in Allentown, Pennsylvania) who earned two caps with the U.S. national team.  He began his professional career in Scotland before moving to the American Soccer League.

Club career
Carnihan began his career with Scottish club Blantyre Victoria.  In 1921, he moved to Partick Thistle for a single season.  In 1922, he moved to the United States where he signed with Bethlehem Steel of the American Soccer League.  Over the next eight seasons, he was a regular in the Bethlehem midfield, playing 210 games in the ASL.  These stats do not include the season that Bethlehem played in the Eastern Professional Soccer League after being suspended by the ASL a month into the 1928-1929 season.  Carnihal was injured in March 1930 and lost most of the rest of that season.  When Bethlehem folded at the end of the 1930 spring season, Carnihan moved to the Newark Americans for the fall 1930 and spring 1931 seasons.  He then played one game with the New York Americans in the fall 1931 season before retiring.

National team
His first game with the national team in a 6-1 win over Canada on 11 November 1925.  His second came almost exactly a year later in a 6-2 win over Canada on 6 November 1926.

See also
List of United States men's international soccer players born outside the United States

References

External links

1894 births
1964 deaths
American soccer players
Scottish footballers
Blantyre Victoria F.C. players
Partick Thistle F.C. players
British emigrants to the United States
United States men's international soccer players
American Soccer League (1921–1933) players
Eastern Professional Soccer League (1928–29) players
Bethlehem Steel F.C. (1907–1930) players
Newark Americans players
New York Americans (soccer) (1933–1956) players
Footballers from Hamilton, South Lanarkshire
Association football midfielders
[[Category:Scottish Junior Football Association players]